Alecz Day (born 1 April 1990) is a New Zealand first-class cricketer who plays for Wellington.

References

External links
 

1990 births
Living people
New Zealand cricketers
Wellington cricketers
Cricketers from Brisbane
Australian emigrants to New Zealand